Thryptomene baeckeacea is a species of flowering plant in the family Myrtaceae and is endemic to Western Australia. It was first formally described in 1864 by Ferdinand von Mueller in Fragmenta phytographiae Australiae from specimens collected by Augustus Oldfield near the Murchison River.

References

baeckeacea
Endemic flora of Western Australia
Rosids of Western Australia
Taxa named by Ferdinand von Mueller